Tronchet is a surname. Notable people with the surname include:

François Denis Tronchet (1726–1806), French politician 
Guillaume Tronchet (1867–1959), French architect
Lucien Tronchet (1902–1982), Swiss baker, mason, and anarcho-syndicalist activist